21st Century Liability is the debut studio album by English singer Yungblud. It was released on 6 July 2018 via Locomotion Recordings, Geffen Records and Interscope Records. It features the singles "21st Century Liability", "Psychotic Kids", "California", "Medication", and "Kill Somebody". In 2019, the track "Polygraph Eyes" was voted into Triple J's Hottest 100 of 2018 at No. 99.

Singles
The title track was the first single released from the LP. It was made available on 4 May 2018 and was described by Yungblud himself as "a song for misunderstood youth growing up in a world of anxiety, confusion and fear." "Psychotic Kids", the next single, was released on 25 May 2018. Its official music video, directed by Adam Powell, was released on 11 June 2018. On 15 June 2018 the LP was made available for pre-order and the track "California" was released the same day as an instant grat. "Medication" was premiered on 3 July 2018 on Zane Lowe's Apple Music radio show as the day's "World Record". A music video for the track, also directed by Powell, was premiered via Billboard on 17 July 2018.

Track listing
Credits taken from Qobuz and Apple Music.

Personnel
 Dominic Harrison – co-writing, vocals, guitar, bass guitar, electronics 
 Matt Schwartz – guitar, bass guitar, keyboards, programming, mixing 
 Martin Terefe – guitar, bass guitar, keyboard

Charts

Weekly charts

Year-end charts

Certifications

Release history

References

2018 debut albums
Yungblud albums
Geffen Records albums
Interscope Records albums